"Dance the Night Away" is a song by American hard rock band Van Halen, and written by its group members.  It is the second song from their 1979 album Van Halen II. While the rest of the songs from this album had existed in various forms since their days doing demos and playing clubs, this song was possibly the only song written during the recording sessions for the album.

Background
The band members conceived the song during the recording sessions while they were standing in a circle humming to each other. It was inspired by Fleetwood Mac's "Go Your Own Way". Eddie Van Halen purposely left a guitar solo out of the final version of the song, replacing it instead with a riff of tap harmonics. David Lee Roth originally wanted to call the song "Dance, Lolita, Dance", but Eddie Van Halen convinced him that "Dance the Night Away" was more suitable and the chorus was changed to reflect that.

Roth claimed, during a 2006 performance in San Diego, California, that he wrote this song in tribute to an intoxicated woman who was having sex in the back of a truck and ran with her pants on backwards while escaping police officers into the bar where the fledgling band was playing.  This was also mentioned at a 2006 performance in Detroit, Michigan.

Reception
Billboard described "Dance the Night Away" as "a melodically driving rocker spiked by blaring guitar riffs, keyboards, bass and a powerful lead vocal.  Cash Box said it was "more melodic" with fewer "guitar pyrotechnics" than previous Van Halen songs.  Record World praised the "slick guitar-percussion intro and break" and Ted Templeman's wall of sound production." Chuck Klosterman of Vulture.com ranked it the third-best Van Halen song, praising Michael Anthony's background vocals and writing that "this song just makes people feel good."

Charts
"Dance the Night Away" was the Van Halen's first top 20 U.S. hit, peaking at number 15 on the Billboard Hot 100. It also reached number 95 on the Billboard Year-End Hot 100 singles of 1979

References

Further reading

External links
 

1979 singles
Van Halen songs
Music videos directed by Bruce Gowers
Song recordings produced by Ted Templeman
1979 songs
Songs written by Eddie Van Halen
Songs written by Alex Van Halen
Songs written by Michael Anthony (musician)
Songs written by David Lee Roth
Warner Records singles
Songs about dancing